Desmanthidae is a family of sponges belonging to the order Bubarida.

Genera:
 Chaladesma List-Armitage & Hooper, 2002
 Desmanthus Topsent, 1893
 Paradesmanthus Pisera & Lévi, 2002
 Petromica Topsent, 1898
 Sulcastrella Schmidt, 1879

References

Sponges